The 1973 Giro d'Italia was the 56th edition of the Giro d'Italia, one of cycling's Grand Tours. The Giro began with a prologue two-man team time trial in Verviers on 18 May, and Stage 11 occurred on 30 May with a stage from Lanciano. The race finished in Trieste on 9 June.

Stage 11
30 May 1973 — Lanciano to Benevento,

Stage 12
31 May 1973 — Benevento to Fiuggi,

Stage 13
1 June 1973 — Fiuggi to Bolsena,

Stage 14
2 June 1973 — Bolsena to Florence,

Stage 15
3 June 1973 — Florence to Forte dei Marmi,

Rest day
4 June 1973

Stage 16
5 June 1973 — Forte dei Marmi to Forte dei Marmi,  (ITT)

Stage 17
6 June 1973 — Forte dei Marmi to Verona,

Stage 18
7 June 1973 — Verona to Andalo,

Stage 19
8 June 1973 — Andalo to Auronzo di Cadore,

Stage 20
9 June 1973 — Auronzo di Cadore to Trieste,

References

1973 Giro d'Italia
Giro d'Italia stages